Nişantaşıspor is a Turkish football club located in Şişli, Turkey.

History 
Nişantaşıspor was unofficially founded in 1907, and officially in 1914. Nişantaşıspor spent most of its entire career in amateur leagues in Turkey. They were bought by the Gülenist organization FETÖ headed by Fethullah Gülen, and reached their peak in the TFF First League for the 1996–97 season. This link was exposed early on, and FETÖ left the club as they got relegated into the amateur leagues.

Colours and badge 
Nişantaşıspor's colours are blue and red.

References

External links 
 Official website
 TFF Profile

Football clubs in Turkey
Association football clubs established in 1914
Sport in Şişli